Cell 213 is a 2011 Canadian horror film starring Bruce Greenwood, Eric Balfour, and Michael Rooker.

Plot
Lawyer Michael Grey (Balfour) is summoned to an isolated prison to defend a murderer. When the murderer violently kills himself during their interview, all eyes are on Grey and he is soon sentenced in the same prison, South River State Penitentiary. Forced to deal with a sadistic guard (Rooker) and an enigmatic Warden (Greenwood) and locked in Cell 213, the same as the murderer who put him in prison, God and the devil battle for Grey's soul.

Cast

Production
Filming took place in fall of 2008 in Ontario. Jonathan Goldsmith recorded the film's music.

Reception
On review aggregator Rotten Tomatoes, the film holds an approval rating of 17% based on six reviews, with an average rating of 3.5/10.

References

External links
 
 
 
 A Chat with Horror Icon Michael Rooker
 Cell 213 Official Trailer
 Cell 213: Locked into a senseless predicament

2011 films
Canadian horror films
English-language Canadian films
2011 horror films
Films shot in Ontario
2010s English-language films
2010s Canadian films